The 2010 NCAA Division I baseball season, play of college baseball in the United States organized by the National Collegiate Athletic Association (NCAA) at the Division I level, began on February 19, 2010.  The season progressed through the regular season, many conference tournaments and championship series, and concluded with the 2010 NCAA Division I baseball tournament and 2010 College World Series.  The College World Series, which consisted of the eight remaining teams in the NCAA tournament, was held in its annual location of Omaha, Nebraska.  It was the final College World Series held at Omaha's Rosenblatt Stadium, which closed following the event.  It concluded on June 30, 2010, with the final game of the best of three championship series.  South Carolina defeated UCLA two games to none to claim their first championship, which was also South Carolina's first national championship in any men's sport.

Realignment

New programs
Seattle added a varsity intercollegiate baseball program for the 2010 season.

Dropped programs
Both Northern Iowa and Vermont dropped their varsity intercollegiate baseball programs following the 2009 season.

Conference changes

Eight former Division I independents formed the new Great West Conference, whose champion would not qualify for the NCAA tournament. The eight schools that formed the conference were Chicago State, Houston Baptist, NJIT, North Dakota, Northern Colorado, NYIT, Texas–Pan American, and Utah Valley.

The Northeast Conference added Bryant, a former Division II member that had been an independent in 2009.

The Missouri Valley Conference, which lost Northern Iowa when it dropped its program, and the America East Conference, which lost Vermont when it dropped its program, each lost one member.

Conference formats
The Southland Conference eliminated the divisional format it had used from 2008–2009.

Preseason
The Texas Longhorns, defeated by LSU in the 2009 CWS championship series, entered the season ranked #1 in the major polls.  Defending national champions LSU received a #2 ranking in the preseason.

Conference standings

Rankings 

The Pac-10 Conference champion Arizona State Sun Devils (47–8) ended the regular season ranked #1 in the USAToday/ESPN poll while the Virginia Cavaliers (47–11) finished #1 in the Baseball America poll.  Preseason #1 Texas stumbled to an 0–3 Big 12 Tournament record to drop to #3 in both final polls.  South Carolina finished the season as a unanimous #1 after winning its first College World Series.

Postseason 

The 2010 NCAA Division I Baseball Tournament began on June 4, 2010.  64 teams qualified for the tournament.  The following teams earned Top 8 National Seeds:
 Arizona State (47–8)
 Texas (46–11) — Eliminated in Super Regional
 Florida (42–15)
 Coastal Carolina (51–7) — Eliminated in Super Regional
 Virginia (47–11) — Eliminated in Super Regional
 UCLA (43–13)
 Louisville (48–12) — Eliminated in Regional
 Georgia Tech (45–13) — Eliminated in Regional

Atlantic Sun Conference champions Mercer earned their first appearance in the NCAA tournament while New Mexico earned their first appearance since 1962.

College World Series

The 2010 season marked the sixty fourth NCAA Baseball Tournament, which culminated with the eight team College World Series.  The College World Series was held in Omaha, Nebraska, and for the last time was played at Johnny Rosenblatt Stadium.  The eight teams played a double-elimination format, with South Carolina claiming their first championship with a two games to none series win over UCLA in the final.

Bracket

Award winners

All-American teams

Major player of the year awards
Dick Howser Trophy: Anthony Rendon, Rice
Baseball America: Anthony Rendon, Rice
Collegiate Baseball: Chris Sale, Florida Gulf Coast
American Baseball Coaches Association: Anthony Rendon, Rice
Golden Spikes Award Bryce Harper, Southern Nevada

Major coach of the year awards
American Baseball Coaches Association: Ray Tanner, South Carolina
Baseball America: Ray Tanner, South Carolina
Collegiate Baseball Coach of the Year: Ray Tanner, South Carolina

Other major awards
Johnny Bench Award (Catcher of the Year): Bryan Holaday, TCU
Baseball America Freshman Of The Year: Matt Purke, TCU

References

External links 
NCAA-Baseball.com 
Standings